The Macro-Somali or Somaloid languages, or (in the conception of Bernd Heine, who does not include Baiso), Sam languages, are a branch of the Lowland East Cushitic languages in the classification of those who do not accept the unity of Omo–Tana. They are spoken in Somalia, Somaliland, Djibouti, eastern Ethiopia, and northern Kenya. The most widely-spoken member is Somali.

Languages
Somaloid
Rendille
Boni
Baiso
Girirra
Somali languages

References

East Cushitic languages